Kamil Cupriak (born 11 November 1994) is a Polish footballer who plays as a centre forward for Zjednoczeni Stryków.

References

External links
 

1994 births
Footballers from Łódź
Living people
Polish footballers
Poland youth international footballers
Association football forwards
Górnik Zabrze players
ŁKS Łódź players
Radomiak Radom players
Siarka Tarnobrzeg players
Ekstraklasa players
I liga players
III liga players